Parvibellus is an extinct genus of panarthropod animal known from the Cambrian of China. It is known from only a single species, P. atavus, found in the Cambrian Stage 3 aged Chengjiang Biota of Yunnan, China.

Morphology 

There is no evidence that Parvibellus had eyes. Many aspects of its morphology, such as its 11 pairs of trunk swimming flaps, and ventrally directed circular mouth, suggest a close relationship with stem-group arthropods such as the "gilled lobopodians" Kerygmachela and Pambdelurion, opabiniids and radiodonts.

References

Fossil taxa described in 2022
Panarthropoda